Tietkensia is a genus of flowering plants in the family Asteraceae described as a genus in 1990.

There is only one known species, Tietkensia corrickiae, endemic to Australia. It is found in Western Australia, South Australia, and Northern Territory.

References

Gnaphalieae
Monotypic Asteraceae genera
Flora of Australia
Plants described in 1990
Taxa named by Philip Sydney Short